Calvary is an oil on wood painting by Antonello da Messina, executed in 1475. Also known as the Antwerp Crucifixion, it is now in the Royal Museum of Fine Arts, Antwerp, making it the only work by the artist in Belgium.

References

Paintings in the collection of the Royal Museum of Fine Arts Antwerp
1475 paintings
Paintings by Antonello da Messina
Antonello